A blobject is a design product, often a brightly-coloured household object which has smooth curves and no sharp edges. The word is a portmanteau of "blob" and "object."

Etymology
The origin of the term is disputed, but it is often attributed to either the designer-author Steven Skov Holt or the designer Karim Rashid.  Author and design journalist Phil Patton attributed the word to Holt in 1993 in Esquire magazine. Holt has defined a blobject as, most often, a colorful, mass-produced, plastic-based, emotionally engaging consumer product with a curvilinear, flowing shape.  This fluid and curvaceous form is the blobject's most distinctive feature. Rashid, the contemporary designer who wrote the book I Want to Change the World, was an early leader in creating blobjects and has become one of the most celebrated designers of his generation.

Overview
Blobjects can also be found in most areas of contemporary visual culture. 
A blobject can be a typographic font (cf. Neville Brody), an animation (cf. Monica Peon), a piece of furniture (Marc Newson), an article of clothing (Rei Kawakubo), a motorcycle (GK Dynamics), a car (GEMCAR), a building (Future Systems), a painting (Rex Ray), a piece of sculpture (Hadeki Matsumoto), or ceramics work (Ken Price). Blobjects can be made of any material in any size or scale for the home, office, car, or outdoors.
Common materials used in fabricating blobjects are plastic (especially polycarbonate, polypropylene, or polyethylene), metal, and rubber, with the aim being to give a more organic and animate feel.

The blobject trend has largely been driven by advances in computer-aided design, information visualization, rapid prototyping, materials, and injection molding. These technologies have given designers the chance to use new shapes and to explore transparency and translucency without significant extra production costs.

More recently, in 2004, author Bruce Sterling used the word in the title of his keynote speech at Siggraph.  In his speech titled, "When Blobjects Rule the Earth", Sterling speculated on the future of graphic simulation when practical differences no longer exist between computer generated models and physically manufactured objects.

See also
 Blobitecture
 Greg Lynn

References

Further reading
 Sterling, Bruce, (2002). Tomorrow Now: Envisioning the Next Fifty Years, Random House, 
 Skov Holt, Steven; Holt Skov, Mara, (2005). Blobjects & Beyond: The New Fluidity in Design, Chronicle Books, 
 Rashid, Karim, (2001). I Want to Change the World, Universe Publishing,

External links
 Boing Boing: When Blobjects Rule the Earth by Bruce Sterling
 Karim Rashid
 San Jose Museum of Art
 Industrial design

Technology in society
Consumer goods
1990s neologisms